Konstantin Petrossian (born 12 August 1946 in Yerevan, Armenia) is a composer, pianist and conductor.

Petrossian graduated from the Romanos Melikian Music College and Komitas State Conservatory in Yerevan. Petrossian taught harmony, theory, and chorale arrangement at R. Melikian Music College. For many years he was also conductor of the Armenian TV/Radio Orchestra, and Director of the Armenian Music Center.

Petrossian is a renowned Armenian composer of symphonic, choral, chamber, instrumental, and vocal music, sound tracks, and theater music. His works are performed, recorded and have been published worldwide. K. Petrossian is a member of the Armenian Union of Composers, American Society of Composers, Authors and Publishers (ASCAP), American Music Center, and Armenian Musical Assembly. He is a Co-Chair of the foreign relations department of the Composers Union of Armenia. He served on  the  Sacred Music Council  of  the Diocese of the Armenian Church of America (Eastern).   Konstantin Petrossian  graduated with a master’s degree in composition and musicology from the Komitas State Conservatory. For many years he has given lectures on harmony, music theory, and choral arrangement at the R. Melikian Music College in Yerevan. He was the artistic director and conductor of the Armenian TV and Radio Orchestra. K.Petrossian became director of the Music Center Department for the Union Composers of Armenia, and, also  the vice president of the Armenian Peace Fund.   Since 1995 he serves as the cultural and music director of Sts. Sahag and Mesrob Armenian Church in Providence, where he founded the unique Arts Education Program for children and adults in the Rhode Island community. During the past 25 years he has organized around 270 cultural and education events.  He organized the Church Junior Choir in 1995  and in April 2006 presented a special Concert of Armenian Sacred Music at the United Nations in New York City.     He has also been the artistic director and conductor of the Armenian Chorale of Rhode Island since 1995, and the Armenian Chorale of Greater Worcester since 2000. Konstantin Petrossian also is the president and artistic director of the Armenian Music Festival of Rhode Island, Inc., which was organized in 1997. In the same year Konstantin Petrossian for the first time presented the "Anoush" Opera in concert with Rhode Island Philharmonic Symphony Orchestra.      Konstantin Petrossian was named “The Armenian of the Year” in the State of Rhode Island. He received many awards, including honorary diplomas from the governor and the senate of the State of Rhode Island and the mayor of Worcester, MA. Petrossian has given numerous performances in many countries, including the former Soviet Union, England, France, Spain, Greece, Finland, Canada, Austria, Italy, Czech Republic, Slovakia, Poland, Hungary, and Germany. Additionally, he has presented his own music in various cities of the United States and has performed at such prestigious venues as Carnegie Hall in New York in 1990 and 1997. In 1991, he was Music Director of the first Armenian concert at the United Nations, NY, dedicated to the independence of the Republic of Armenia.    He has been the Music Director and Conductor of the Erevan Choral Society of Boston since 2009.    In 2013, Maestro Konstantin Petrossian was awarded the “Movses Khorenatsi Medal” by President of Armenia. The medal is the country’s highest cultural award.      In June 2014, he received the prestigious Sts. Sahag and Mesrob Medal, one of the highest honors of the Armenian Apostolic Church, accompanied by an encyclical from His Holiness Karekin II, Supreme Patriarch and Catholicos of All Armenians, in recognition of distinguished achievement in service to the Church and Armenian culture. 

Petrossian is a member of the following organizations:
 Union Composers of Armenia
 ASCAP
 Armenian Musical Assembly

Petrossian serves as Cultural and Music Director of Sts. Sahag and Mesrob Armenian Church in Providence, Rhode Island, and has also been the Artistic Director and Conductor of the Armenian Chorale of Rhode Island, and Armenian Chorale of greater Worcester, Massachusetts. He also serves as the President and Artistic Director of the Armenian Music Festival of Rhode Island, Inc.

Compositions 
Orchestral
 Symphonic Poem for Orchestra, 1971
 “Rechitative” for Symphony Orchestra, 1972
 Concert for Chamber Orchestra, 1973
 Variations for Flugelhorn and Orchestra, 1979
 Ballad for Guitar and Orchestra, 1980
 Prelude for Piano and String Orchestra, 1983
 Sonnet for Piano and Orchestra, dedicated to his lovely wife-Janna, 1987
 Three Pieces for Piano and Chamber Orchestra, 1990
 Contemplation for Piano and Orchestra, 1992
 Elegy for Piano and String Orchestra, 1992
 Rhapsody for String Orchestra, 1999
 Fantasy for Guitar and String Orchestra, 2012
 Vocalise for Cello and Symphony Orchestra, 2014

Choral
 Four Folk Songs for an a Cappella Choir, 1987
 “Chimes of the Homeland”, Cycle of  10 Folk Songs for an a Cappella Women’s Choir, 2003
 Our New Armenia for Choir and Orchestra, lyrics by Aramayis Sahakyan, 2011

Chamber and solo instruments 
 Trio for Flute, Bassoon and Piano, 1964
 String Quartet, 1967
 Woodwind Quintet N1, 1971
 Woodwind Quintet N2, 1987
 “Dialogues” for Violin and Cello, 1987
 Four Miniatures for String Quartet, 1990
 Duets for Guitar and Flutes, 2000
 Trio for Flute, Clarinet and Piano, 2002
 Nocturne for Violin and Piano, dedicated to memory of Edvard Baghdasaryan, 2014
 “Tamzara” for Marimba, 2016
 Vocalise for Oboe and Piano, 2016
 Serenade for Cello and Piano, 2016
 Octet for Trombones, 2017
 “For Lilit”, for Piano, dedicated to Lilit Artemyan, 2017
 Scherzo for Trumpet and Piano, 2019

Sonatas
 Sonata for Violin and Piano, 1965
 Sonata for Solo Viola, dedicated to Yuri Manukyan, 1978
 Sonata for Trombone and Piano, 1984
 Sonata for Trumpet and Piano, 1985
 Sonata for Solo Violin, dedicated to Victor Khachatryan, 1985
 Sonata for Bassoon and Piano, 1986
 Sonata for Clarinet and Piano, 1988
 Sonata for Viola and Piano, 1988
 Sonata for French Horn and Piano, 1997
 Sonata for Flute and Piano, 2004
 Sonata for Oboe and Piano, 2006
 Sonata for Solo Flute, dedicated to Artashes Grigoryan, 2014

Suitas
 Suite for Piano, 1979
 Suite for Flute and Clarinet, 1989
 Suite for Chamber Ensemble, 1996

 Vocal cycles 
 “In the Language of Nature”, Vocal Cycle for Bariton and Piano, lyrics by Garik Banduryan, 1974
 “The Call of Longing” Vocal Cycle for Soprano and Piano, lyrics by Silva Kaputikyan, 1976
 “Taghs” Vocal cycle for Baritone, Cello, Piano and Percussion instruments, lyrics by Petros Duryan, 1984
   “Monologue” Vocal Cycle for Soprano and Piano, lyrics by Razmik Davoyan, 1985

 Compositions for Big Band 
 Contemplation for Saxophone and Big Band, 1964
 Spring Sketch for Trumpet and Big Band, 1967
 “Garni” Piece for Big Band, 1976
 “Album Leaf”, for Big Band, 1977
 Awakening, for Big Band, 1978
 “Hot Afternoon”, for Big Band, 1978
 Again Spring, Piece for Trombone and Big Band, 1978
 Concert for Voice and Big Band, 1986
 “Gyumri” Piece for Big Band, dedicated to Hovhannes Avetisyan, 2018

Vocal Compositions
 Impromtu for Voice and Orchestra, 1968
 “My Generation” for Voice and Orchestra, lyrics by Garik Banduryan,1977
 “Cosmos” for Voice and Orchestra, lyrics by Aramayis Sahakyan, 1978
 “Do not Call” for Voice and Orchestra, lyrics by R. Luskene, 1978
 “It’s Time for my Spring” for Voice and Orchestra, lyrics by Kristophor Zakiyan, 1978
 “Faith of Love” for Voice and Orchestra, lyrics by Garik Banduryan, 1978
 “The Magic World” for Voice and Orchestra, lyrics by Alexey Vasilenko, 1979
 “Green May” for Voice and Orchestra, 1980
 “My Kapan” for Voice and Orchestra, lyrics by Garik Banduryan, 1983
 “I Rarely Dreamed of you”,for Voice and Orchestra, lyrics by Lyudmila Govryushina, 1983
 “Armenia” for Voice, Choir and Orchestra, lyrics by Nansen Mikayelyan, 1984
 “Confession” for Voice and Orchestra, lyrics by Arshavir Torosyan, 1984
 “Dream my Love” for Voice and Orchestra, lyrics by Arshavir Torosyan, 1984
 “New Year” for Voice and Orchestra, lyrics by Suren Muradyan, 1985
 “Two Tickets”, for Voice and Orchestra, lyrics by Mikhail Plyatskovski, 1988
 “For Armenian Children for Voice”, Choir and Orchestra, lyrics by Gevorg Karapetyan, 1989
 “Forgotten Light” for Voice and Orchestra, lyrics by NarineHarutyunyan, 1990
 Mother of God for Choir and Symphony Orchestra, lyrics by Archbishop Nerses Pozapalyan, 1991
 “Knights of Vardan” for Voice and Orchestra, lyrics by Arshavir Torosyan,1991
 “Etchmiadzin” for Voice and Piano, lyrics by Hovhannes Hovhannisyan, 1995
 “Heart of our Nation, Ararat”, for Voice, Choir and Symphony Orchestra, lyrics by Arshavir Torosyan, 1997
 “Evening Melody” for Voice, Choir and Symphony Orchestra, lyrics by Rev. Fr. MesropTashchyan, 1998
 Vocalise for Voice, Choir and Orchestra, 2013
 “Haykazyan Nation” for Voice, Choir and Orchestra, lyrics by Gevorg Karapetyan, 2013
 “Love Fairy Tale”, for Voice and Orchestra, lyrics by Nushik Mikaelyan, 2016
 “To the Fighters of Artsakh”, for Voice and Orchestra, lyrics by Arshavir Torosyan, 2017

Music For Movies and Theatrical Presentations
 D/F “Tigran Petrosyan - Champion”, 1963
 D/F “Armenia”, 1966
 “Blue Deers” TV Theatrical Presentation, director – Knarik Sargsyan, 1986

References

External links
 Konstantin Petrossian official website

1946 births
Living people
Armenian pianists
Armenian composers
Armenian conductors (music)
Armenian academics
21st-century conductors (music)
21st-century pianists